Ahmed Nabil Koka (born 4 July 2001) is an Egyptian professional footballer who plays as a midfielder for Al Ahly.

Career statistics

Club

Notes

References

2001 births
Living people
Egyptian footballers
Egypt youth international footballers
Association football midfielders
Egyptian Premier League players
Al Ahly SC players